The 2005 Western Illinois Leathernecks football team represented Western Illinois University as a member of the Gateway Football Conference during the 2005 NCAA Division I-AA football season. They were led by seventh-year head coach Don Patterson and played their home games at Hanson Field in Macomb, Illinois. The Leathernecks finished the season with a 5–6 record overall and a 3–4 record in conference play.

Schedule

References

Western Illinois
Western Illinois Leathernecks football seasons
Western Illinois Leathernecks football